Pryor Creek is a stream in Bates and Vernon Counties in the U.S. state of Missouri. It is a tributary of the Little Osage River.

Pryor Creek has the name of William Pryor, a pioneer citizen.

See also
List of rivers of Missouri

References

Rivers of Bates County, Missouri
Rivers of Vernon County, Missouri
Rivers of Missouri